The Australian Army Psychology Corps (AA Psych) is the branch of the Australian Army responsible for providing psychological care to Army personnel. Unique at time in the British Commonwealth, the corps was formed on 22 October 1952, replacing the Australian Army Psychology Service which was formed in 1945.

Notes

References

Further reading
Menezes, G. (2009). Testing times: A history of the Australian Army Psychology Corps. The need is established. (Unpublished book chapter). Canberra: Directorate of Psychology.

External links
https://web.archive.org/web/20151223051235/http://www.army.gov.au/Our-people/Corps/Psychology
http://www.psychology.org.au/publications/inpsych/2010/april/murphy/
http://www.vvaa.org.au/birthday.htm

Psychology
Military units and formations established in 1952
1952 establishments in Australia